Paldeo, also spelt 'Paldev', was a princely estate (Jagir) in India during the British Raj. It was under the Bundelkhand Agency of the Central India Agency until 1896 when it was transferred to the Baghelkhand Agency. In 1931 it was transferred back to the Bundelkhand Agency.
It had an area of 52 square miles. In 1940 its population was 9,820 distributed in 18 villages. Paldeo Estate was merged into the Indian state of Vindhya Pradesh in 1948.

History
Paldeo was founded in 1812. It was one of the Chaube Jagirs.

Rulers
Paldeo's rulers bore the title 'Rao'.

Raos 
1812 - 1840                Dariao Singh                       (d. 1840)
1840 -                  Nathu Ram
1840 - Oct 1842            Raja Ram                           (d. 1842)
1842 - 1865                Sheo Prasad                        (d. 1865)
1865 -  2 Apr 1874         Mukund Singh                       (d. 1874)
 2 Apr 1874 - 1891         Anrudh Singh                       (b. 1837 - d. 1891) (personal style 'Rao' from 1877)
1891 - 1894                Narayan Das                        (b. 1836 - d. 1894)
16 Feb 1894 -  2 Oct 1923  Jagat Rai                          (b. 1865 - d. 1923)
 3 Oct 1923 - 1947         Shiva Prasad                       (b. 1908 - d. 1954)

See also
 Bundelkhand Agency
 Political integration of India

References 

Satna district
Princely states of Madhya Pradesh